Tatsuhito Noro (born June 24, 1988)  is a Japanese professional  basketball player who plays for Beefman.exe . He played college basketball for Tokai University. He represented the country for Japan national 3x3 team.

References

External links

1988 births
Living people
Japanese men's basketball players
Japan national 3x3 basketball team players
Sportspeople from Hokkaido
Forwards (basketball)